Eli May Saulsbury (December 29, 1817 – March 22, 1893) was an American lawyer and politician from Dover, in Kent County, Delaware. He was a member of the Democratic Party, who served in the Delaware General Assembly and as U.S. Senator from Delaware.

Early life and family
Saulsbury was born in Mispillion Hundred, Kent County, Delaware, son of William & Margaret Ann Smith Saulsbury. He was the middle brother of Governor Gove Saulsbury and U.S. Senator Willard Saulsbury Sr.  Saulsbury was educated at Dickinson College, studied law, was admitted to the Delaware Bar in 1857, and began his practice in Dover, Delaware, where he lived.

Political career
Saulsbury served one term in the State House, during the 1853/54 session. In 1871 he successfully challenged his younger brother, incumbent U.S. Senator Willard Saulsbury Sr., for his seat in the U.S. Senate. He went on to win three full terms but was defeated in an attempt for a fourth term by Republican candidate Anthony Higgins.  He was in office from March 4, 1871, until March 3, 1889, and served on the Committee on Privileges and Elections in the 46th Congress, and the Committee on Engrossed Bills in the 47th Congress through the 50th Congress.

He opposed civil rights for African Americans in 1873.

Death and legacy
Saulsbury died at Dover and is buried there in the Silver Lake Cemetery.

Almanac
Elections are held the first week of November. Members of the Delaware General Assembly take office the first week of January. The State House has a term of two years. The General Assembly chose the U.S. Senators, who took office March 4 for a six-year term.

References

Images
Biographical Directory of the United States Congress

External links
Biographical Directory of the United States Congress
Delaware’s Members of Congress

The Political Graveyard

Places with more information
Delaware Historical Society; website; 505 North Market Street, Wilmington, Delaware 19801
University of Delaware; Library website; 181 South College Avenue, Newark, Delaware 19717

1817 births
1893 deaths
People from Dover, Delaware
Dickinson College alumni
Delaware lawyers
Democratic Party members of the Delaware House of Representatives
Democratic Party United States senators from Delaware
Burials in Dover, Delaware
Saulsbury family
19th-century American politicians
19th-century American lawyers